The Journal of Mechanics in Medicine and Biology is a peer-reviewed medical journal that was established in 2001 and is published by World Scientific. It covers research in the field of mechanics as applied to medicine and biology.

Abstracting and indexing 
The journal is abstracted and indexed in:

 Academic OneFile
 Academic Search Complete/ Elite/ Premier
 Baidu
 CNKI Scholar
 CnpLINKer
 Compendex
 CrossRef
 CSA Physical Education Abstracts
 Ebsco Discovery Service
 Ebsco Electronic Journal Service (EJS)
 ExLibris Primo Central
 Google Scholar
 Health Reference Center Academic (Gale)
 J-Gate
 Journal Citation Reports/Science Edition
 Naver
 NSTL - National Science and Technology Libraries
 OCLC WorldCat®
 ProQuest SciTech Premium Collection
 Science Citation Index Expanded (SCIE)
 Scopus
 The Summon® Service
 WanFang Data

The journal has a 2020 SCI impact factor of 0.897.

References

External links 
 

English-language journals
Biomedical engineering journals
General medical journals
Publications established in 2001
World Scientific academic journals